
 This is a complete list of school districts in the State of Minnesota.

Aitkin County

 Aitkin Public School District (ISD #1)
 Hill City Public School District (ISD #2)
 McGregor School District (ISD #4)

Anoka County

 Anoka-Hennepin Public School District (ISD #11)
 Centennial Public School District (ISD #12)
 Columbia Heights Public School District (ISD #13)
 Fridley Public School District (ISD #14)
 Saint Francis School District (ISD #15)
 Spring Lake Park School District (ISD #16)

Becker County

 Detroit Lakes Public School District (ISD #22)
 Frazee-Vergas Public School District (ISD #23)
 Lake Park-Audubon School District (ISD #24)
 Pine Point School District (ISD #25)

Beltrami County

 Bemidji Area Schools (ISD #31)
 Blackduck Public School District (ISD #32)
 Kelliher Public School District (ISD #36)
 Red Lake School District (ISD #38)

Benton County

 Foley Public School District (ISD #51)
 Sauk Rapids School District (ISD #47)

Big Stone County

 Clinton-Graceville-Beardsley School District (ISD #2888)
 Ortonville School District (ISD #2903)

Blue Earth County

 Lake Crystal-Wellcome Memorial School District (ISD #2071)
 Mankato School District (ISD #77)
 Maple River School District (ISD #2135)
 Saint Clair School District (ISD #75)

Brown County

 Comfrey Public School District (ISD #81)
 New Ulm School District (ISD #88)
 Sleepy Eye School District (ISD #84)
 Springfield School District (ISD #85)

Carlton County

 Barnum Public School District (ISD #91)
 Carlton Public School District (ISD #93)
 Cloquet Public School District (ISD #94)
 Cromwell-Wright School District (ISD #95)
 Esko Public School District (ISD #99)
 Moose Lake School District (ISD #97)
 Wrenshall School District (ISD #100)

Carver County

 Central Public Schools (ISD #108)
 Eastern Carver County Schools (ISD #112)
 Waconia Public Schools (ISD #110)
 Watertown-Mayer School District (ISD #111)

Cass County

 Cass Lake-Bena School District (ISD #115)
 Northland Community School District (ISD #118)
 Pillager School District (ISD #116)
 Pine River-Backus School District (ISD #2174)
 Walker-Hackensack-Akeley School District (ISD #113)

Chippewa County

 MACCRAY Public Schools (ISD #2180)
 Montevideo School District (ISD #129)

Chisago County

 Chisago Lakes School District (ISD #2144)
 North Branch School District (ISD #138)
 Rush City School District (ISD #139)

Clay County

 Barnesville Public School District (ISD #146)
 Dilworth-Glyndon-Felton School District (ISD #2164)
 Hawley Public School District (ISD #150)
 Moorhead School District (ISD #152)
 Ulen-Hitterdal School District (ISD #914)

Clearwater County

 Bagley Public School District (ISD #162)
 Clearbrook-Gonvick School District (ISD #2311)

Cook County
 Cook County School District (ISD #166)

Cottonwood County

 Mountain Lake School District (ISD #173)
 Westbrook-Walnut Grove School District (ISD #2898)
 Windom School District (ISD #177)

Crow Wing County

 Brainerd Public School District (ISD #181)
 Crosby-Ironton Public School District (ISD #182)
 Pequot Lakes School District (ISD #186)

Dakota County

 Burnsville-Eagan-Savage School District (ISD #191)
 Farmington Area Public Schools (ISD #192)
 Hastings Public School District (ISD 200)
 Intermediate School District 917
 Inver Grove Heights School District (ISD 199)
 Lakeville Independent School District 194
 Randolph School District (ISD 195)
 Rosemount-Apple Valley-Eagan School District (ISD #196)
 South Saint Paul School District (Special School District #6)
 West Saint Paul-Mendota Heights-Eagan School District (ISD #197)

Dodge County

 Hayfield Public School District (ISD #203)
 Kasson-Mantorville School District (ISD #204)
 Triton School District (ISD #2125)

Douglas County

 Alexandria Public School District (ISD #206)
 Brandon-Evansville School District (ISD #2908)
 Osakis School District (ISD #213)

Faribault County

 Blue Earth Area Public School District (ISD #2860)
 United South Central School District (ISD #2134)

Fillmore County

 Fillmore Central School District (ISD #2198)
 Kingsland School District (ISD #2137)
 Lanesboro School District (ISD #229)
 Mabel-Canton School District (ISD #238)
 Rushford-Peterson School District (ISD #239)

Freeborn County

 Albert Lea Public School District (ISD #241)
 Alden-Conger Public School District (ISD #242)
 Glenville-Emmons School District (ISD #2886)

Goodhue County

 Cannon Falls Area Schools (ISD #252)
 Goodhue School District (ISD #253)
 Kenyon-Wanamingo School District (ISD #2172)
 Pine Island School District (ISD #255)
 Red Wing Public Schools (ISD #256)

Grant County

 Ashby Public School District (ISD #261)
 Herman-Norcross Public School District (ISD #264)
 West Central Area Schools (ISD #2342)

Hennepin County

 Bloomington Public School District (ISD #271)
 Brooklyn Center School District (ISD #286)
 Eden Prairie Public School District (ISD #272)
 Edina Public Schools (ISD #273)
 Hopkins Public Schools (ISD #270)
 Intermediate School District 287
 Minneapolis Public Schools (Special School District #1)
 Minnetonka School District (ISD #276)
 Orono School District (ISD #278)
 Osseo School District (ISD #279)
 Richfield Public Schools (ISD #280)
 Robbinsdale Area Schools (ISD #281)
 St. Anthony-New Brighton School District (ISD #282)
 Saint Louis Park School District (ISD #283)
 Wayzata Public Schools (ISD #284)
 Westonka School District (ISD #277)

Houston County

 Caledonia Public School District (ISD #299)
 Houston Public Schools (ISD #294)
 La Crescent-Hokah School District (ISD #300)
 Spring Grove School District (ISD #297)

Hubbard County

 Laporte School District (ISD #306)
 Nevis School District (ISD #308)
 Park Rapids School District (ISD #309)

Isanti County

 Braham Public School District (ISD #314)
 Cambridge-Isanti Public School District (ISD #911)

Itasca County

 Deer River Public School District (ISD #317)
 Grand Rapids School District - Independent School District 318
 Greenway School District (ISD #316)
 Nashwauk-Keewatin School District (ISD #319)

Jackson County

 Heron Lake-Okabena Public School District (ISD #330)
 Jackson County Central School District (ISD #2895)

Kanabec County

 Mora School District (ISD #332)
 Ogilvie School District (ISD #333)

Kandiyohi County

 New London-Spicer School District (ISD #345)
 Willmar School District (ISD #347)

Kittson County

 Kittson Central School District (ISD #2171)
 Lancaster School District (ISD #356)
 Tri-County School District (ISD #2358)

Koochiching County

 International Falls School District (ISD #361)
 Littlefork-Big Falls School District (ISD #362)
 South Koochiching School District (ISD #363)

Lac Qui Parle County

 Dawson-Boyd Public School District (ISD #378)
 Lac Qui Parle Valley School District (ISD #2853)

Lake County
 Lake Superior School District (ISD #381)

Lake of the Woods County
 Lake of the Woods School District (ISD #390)

Le Sueur County

 Cleveland Public School District (ISD #391)
 Le Sueur-Henderson School District (ISD #397)
 Tri-City United School District (ISD #2905)
 Waterville-Elysian-Morristown School District (ISD #2143)

Lincoln County

 Hendricks Public School District (ISD #402)
 Ivanhoe Public School District (ISD #403)
 Lake Benton School District (ISD #404)
 Russell Tyler Ruthton School District (ISD #2902)

Lyon County

 Lakeview School District (ISD #2167)
 Lynd School District (ISD #415)
 Marshall School District (ISD #413)
 Minneota School District (ISD #414)
 Tracy School District (ISD #2904)

Mahnomen County

 Mahnomen School District (ISD #432)
 Waubun-Ogema-White Earth School District (ISD #435)

Marshall County

 Grygla School District (ISD #447)
 Marshall County Central School District (ISD #441)
 Stephen-Argyle School District (ISD #2856)
 Warren-Alvarado-Oslo School District (ISD #2176)

Martin County

 Fairmont Area School District (ISD #2752)
 Granada Huntley-East Chain School District (ISD #2536)
 Martin County West School District (ISD #2448)
 Truman School District (ISD #458)

McLeod County

 Glencoe-Silver Lake School District (ISD #2859)
 Hutchinson Public School District (ISD #423)
 Lester Prairie School District (ISD #424)

Meeker County

 Atwater-Cosmos-Grove-City School District (ISD #2396)
 Eden Valley-Watkins School District (ISD #463)
 Litchfield School District (ISD #465)

Mille Lacs County

 Isle Public School District (ISD #473)
 Milaca School District (ISD #912)
 Onamia School District (ISD #480)
 Princeton School District (ISD #477)

Morrison County

 Little Falls School District (ISD #482)
 Pierz School District (ISD #484)
 Royalton School District (ISD #485)
 Swanville School District (ISD #486)
 Upsala School District (ISD #487)

Mower County

 Austin Public School District (ISD #492)
 Grand Meadow School District (ISD #495)
 Leroy-Ostrander School District (ISD #499)
 Lyle School District (ISD #497)
 Southland School District (ISD #500)

Murray County

 Fulda Public School District (ISD #505)
 Murray County Central School District (ISD #2169)

Nicollet County

 Nicollet School District (ISD #507)
 Saint Peter School District (ISD #508)

Nobles County

 Adrian Public School District (ISD #511)
 Ellsworth Public School District (ISD #514)
 Round Lake-Brewster School District (ISD #2907)
 Worthington School District (ISD #518)

Norman County

 Ada-Borup-West Public School District (ISD #2910)
 Norman County East School District (ISD #2215)

Olmsted County

 Byron Public School District (ISD #531)
 Chatfield School District (ISD #227)
 Dover-Eyota Public School District (ISD #533)
 Rochester School District (ISD #535)
 Stewartville School District (ISD #534)

Otter Tail County

 Battle Lake Public School District (ISD #542)
 Fergus Falls Public School District (ISD #544)
 Henning Public School District (ISD #545)
 New York Mills School District (ISD #553)
 Parkers Prairie School District (ISD #547)
 Pelican Rapids School District (ISD #548)
 Perham-Dent School District (ISD #549)
 Underwood School District (ISD #550)

Pennington County

 Goodridge School District (ISD #561)
 Thief River Falls School District (ISD #564)

Pine County

 East Central School District (ISD #2580)
 Hinckley-Finlayson Public School District (ISD #2165)
 Pine City School District (ISD #578)
 Willow River School District (ISD #577)

Pipestone County

 Edgerton Public School District (ISD #581)
 Pipestone Area School District (ISD #2689)

Polk County

 Climax-Shelly Public School (ISD #592)
 Crookston Public School District (ISD #593)
 East Grand Forks Public School District (ISD #595)
 Fertile-Beltrami School District (ISD #599)
 Fisher Public School District (ISD #600)
 Fosston Public School District (ISD #601)
 Win-E-Mac School District (ISD #2609)

Pope County
 Minnewaska School District (ISD #2149)

Ramsey County

 Mounds View School District (ISD #621)
 North Saint Paul-Maplewood Oakdale School District (ISD #622)
 Northeast Metro 916 Intermediate School District 
 Roseville Area Schools (ISD #623)
 Saint Paul Public Schools (ISD #625)
 White Bear Lake Area School District (ISD #624)

Red Lake County

 Red Lake County Central School District (ISD #2906)
 Red Lake Falls School District (ISD #630)

Redwood County

 Cedar Mountain School District (ISD #2754)
 Milroy School District (ISD #635)
 Red Rock Central School District (ISD #2884)
 Redwood Valley Area School District (ISD #2897)
 Wabasso School District (ISD #640)

Renville County

 Bird Island-Olivia-Lake Lillian Public School District (ISD #2534)
 Buffalo Lake-Hector-Stewart Public School District (ISD #2159)
 Renville County West School District (ISD #2890)

Rice County

 Faribault Public School District (ISD #656)
 Northfield School District (ISD #659)

Rock County

 Hills-Beaver Creek Public School District (ISD #671)
 Luverne School District (ISD #2184)

Roseau County

 Badger Public School District (ISD #676)
 Greenbush-Middle River School District (ISD #2683)
 Roseau School District (ISD #682)
 Warroad School District (ISD #690)

Saint Louis County

 Chisholm Public School District (ISD #695)
 Duluth Public Schools (ISD #709)
 Ely Public School District (ISD #696)
 Floodwood Public School District (ISD #698)
 Hermantown Public School District (ISD #700)
 Hibbing Public School District (ISD #701)
 Mesabi East School District (ISD #2711)
 Mountain Iron-Buhl School District (ISD #712)
 Proctor School District (ISD #704)
 Rock Ridge Public Schools (ISD #2909)
 Saint Louis County School District (ISD #2142)

Scott County

 Belle Plaine Public School District (ISD #716)
 Jordan School District (ISD #717)
 New Prague Area School District (ISD #721)
 Prior Lake-Savage School District (ISD #719)
 Shakopee School District (ISD #720)
 SouthWest Metro Intermediate District #288

Sherburne County

 Becker Public School District (ISD #726)
 Big Lake Public School District (ISD #727)
 Independent School District 728

Sibley County

 Gibbon Fairfax Winthrop School District (ISD #2365)
 Sibley East Public Schools (ISD #2310)

Stearns County

 Albany Public School District (ISD #745)
 Belgrade-Brooten-Elrosa Public School District (ISD #2364)
 Holdingford Public School District (ISD #738)
 Kimball Public School District (ISD #739)
 Melrose School District (ISD #740)
 Paynesville School District (ISD #741)
 Rocori School District (ISD #750)
 Saint Cloud School District (ISD #742)
 Sartell-St. Stephen School District (ISD #748)
 Sauk Centre School District (ISD #743)
 West Central Area Schools (ISD #2342)

Steele County

 Blooming Prairie Public School District (ISD #756)
 Medford School District (ISD #763)
 Owatonna School District (ISD #761)

Stevens County

 Chokio-Alberta Public School District (ISD #771)
 Hancock Public School District (ISD #768)
 Morris School District (ISD #2769)

Swift County

 Benson Public School District (ISD #777)
 Kerkhoven-Murdock-Sunburg School District (ISD #775)

Todd County

 Bertha-Hewitt Public School District (ISD #786)
 Browerville Public School District (ISD #787)
 Long Prairie-Grey Eagle School District (ISD #2753)
 Staples-Motley School District (ISD #2170)

Traverse County

 Browns Valley Public School District (ISD #801)
 Wheaton Area School School District (ISD #803)

Wabasha County

 Lake City School District (ISD #813)
 Plainview Elgin Millville School District (ISD #2899)
 Wabasha-Kellogg School District (ISD #811)
 Zumbrota-Mazeppa School District (ISD #2805)

Wadena County

 Menahga School District (ISD #821)
 Sebeka School District (ISD #820)
 Verndale School District (ISD #818)
 Wadena-Deer Creek School District (ISD #2155)

Waseca County

 Janesville-Waldorf-Pemberton School District (ISD #2835)
 New Richland Hartland Ellendale Geneva School District (ISD #2168)
 Waseca School District (ISD #829)

Washington County

 Forest Lake Public School District (ISD #831)
 Mahtomedi School District (ISD #832)
 South Washington County School District (ISD #833)
 Stillwater School District (ISD (#834)

Watonwan County

 Butterfield Public School District (ISD #836)
 Madelia School District (ISD #837)
 Saint James School District (ISD #840)

Wilkin County

 Breckenridge Public School District (ISD #846)
 Campbell-Tintah Public School District (ISD #852)
 Rothsay School District (ISD #850)

Winona County

 Lewiston-Altura School District (ISD #857)
 Saint Charles School District (ISD #858)
 Winona Independent School District (ISD #861)

Wright County

 Annandale Public School District (ISD #876)
 Buffalo-Hanover-Montrose Schools (ISD #877)
 Dassel-Cokato Public School District (ISD #466)
 Delano Public School District (ISD #879)
 Howard Lake-Waverly-Winsted Public School District  (ISD #2687)
 Maple Lake School District (ISD #881)
 Monticello School District (ISD #882)
 Rockford Area Schools (ISD #883)
 Saint Michael-Albertville School District (ISD #885)

Yellow Medicine County

 Canby Public School District (ISD #891)
 Yellow Medicine East School District (ISD #2190)

External links
List of school districts from the Minnesota Department of Administration
List of school districts from GreatSchools.net

 
School districts
Minnesota